The men's decathlon at the 2022 World Athletics U20 Championships was held at the Estadio Olímpico Pascual Guerrero on 1 and 2 August.

Records
U20 standing records prior to the 2022 World Athletics U20 Championships were as follows:

Results

References

External links
Final results summary

heptathlon
Combined events at the World Athletics U20 Championships